Mavirus is a genus of double stranded DNA virus that can infect the marine phagotrophic flagellate Cafeteria roenbergensis, but only in the presence of the giant CroV virus (Cafeteria roenbergensis).  The genus contains only one species, Cafeteriavirus-dependent mavirus.  Mavirus can integrate into the genome of cells of C. roenbergensis, and thereby confer immunity to the population 

The name is derived from Maverick virus.

The virophage was discovered by Matthias G. Fischer of the University of British Columbia while he was working on Cafeteria roenbergensis virus as part of his PhD.


Virology
The genome is 19,063 bases long and encodes 20 predicted coding sequences. Seven have homology to the Maverick/Polinton family of transposons.

The genome encodes a retroviral integrase, an adenosine triphosphatase (ATPase), a cysteine protease and a protein primed DNA polymerase B.

Classification
Mavirus is a genus  in the family Lavidaviridae, which has been established by the International Committee on Taxonomy of Viruses in 2016.

References

Double-stranded DNA viruses
Virophages
Virus genera